"Ev'ry Heart Should Have One" is a song written by Bill Shore and Byron Gallimore, and recorded by American country music artist Charley Pride.  It was released in September 1983 as the second single from his album Night Games.  The song peaked at number 2 on the Billboard Hot Country Singles chart.

Music video
A video was produced for the song and was directed by Robert Small.

Chart performance

References

1983 singles
1983 songs
Charley Pride songs
RCA Records singles
Song recordings produced by Norro Wilson
Songs written by Bill Shore
Songs written by Byron Gallimore